These are the official results of the men's 4 × 100 metres relay event at the 1976 Summer Olympics in Montreal, Quebec, Canada. The event was held on 30 and 31 July 1976.  There were a total number of 20 nations competing.

Medalists

Records
These were the standing World and Olympic records (in seconds) prior to the 1976 Summer Olympics.

Results

Final
Held on 31 July 1976

Semifinals
Held on 30 July 1976

Heat 1

Heat 2

Heats

Heat 1

Heat 2

Heat 3

References

External links
 Official Report
 Results

R
Relay foot races at the Olympics
Men's events at the 1976 Summer Olympics